Satsuki Obata (born 24 May 1977) is a Japanese gymnast. She competed in four events at the 1996 Summer Olympics.

References

1977 births
Living people
Japanese female artistic gymnasts
Olympic gymnasts of Japan
Gymnasts at the 1996 Summer Olympics
Sportspeople from Shiga Prefecture
Asian Games medalists in gymnastics
Gymnasts at the 1994 Asian Games
Asian Games silver medalists for Japan
Medalists at the 1994 Asian Games
20th-century Japanese women